Epermenia philocoma is a moth in the family Epermeniidae. It was described by Edward Meyrick in 1914. It is found in India.

The wingspan is about 11 mm. The forewings are clear brassy yellow, the basal third of the costa sprinkled with dark fuscous and with an ochreous-brown triangular patch with violet reflections extending along the posterior half of the dorsum and termen to the apex, reaching more than halfway across the wings. The anterior edge is obliquely marked with two silvery-lilac spots sprinkled with blackish representing the plical and first discal stigmata. There is a less marked similar spot above the tornus, apparently representing the second discal stigma. The hindwings are grey.

The larvae have a reddish body and head. They have been recorded living in a white web on the midrib of an unknown plant, the web being on both sides of the leaf, kept off the surface by little pillars of excrement. The webs on either surface of the leaf are connected by holes through the leaf itself, and the larva uses these holes as a means of escaping observation. The cocoon is separate and made close to the midrib. It is oval and resembles a bird dropping.

References

Epermeniidae
Moths described in 1914
Moths of Asia